Matthew or Matt Richardson may refer to:

Sportspeople
 Matthew Richardson (cyclist) (born 1999), Australian track cyclist
 Matthew Richardson (cricketer) (born 1985), South African cricketer
 Matthew Richardson (footballer) (born 1975), former Richmond Football Club player
 Matthew Richardson (golfer) (born 1984), English golfer
 Matthew Richardson (administrator), Australian rules football administrator
 Matt Richardson (footballer)

Academics
 Matthew Richardson (economist), New York University professor
 Matthew O. Richardson (born 1960), Advancement Vice President at Brigham Young University

Others
 Matthew Kendal Richardson (1839–1917), English-born merchant and political figure in Ontario, Canada
 Matt Richardson (born 1991), English comedian and presenter